Dramane Sereme (born 23 May 1942) is a Malian athlete. He competed in the men's decathlon at the 1964 Summer Olympics.

References

External links
 

1942 births
Living people
Athletes (track and field) at the 1964 Summer Olympics
Malian decathletes
Olympic athletes of Mali
Place of birth missing (living people)
21st-century Malian people